SGR may refer to:

 Heart Colchester and Heart Ipswich, radio stations in Suffolk, England both once known as SGR
 Sagittarius (constellation) abbreviation
 Scary Go Round, a webcomic
 Scientists for Global Responsibility, a United Kingdom group that promotes the ethical practice and use of science and technology
 Segar LRT station in Bukit Panjang, Singapore (LRT station abbreviation)
 Select Graphic Rendition (ANSI), an ANSI X3.64 escape sequence
 Service Général du Renseignement et de la Sécurité, the French name of the Belgian General Information and Security Service
 SGR (band), a ska band from New Jersey, United States
 Shale Gouge Ratio, a mathematical algorithm aiming to predict the fault rock types for simple fault zones
 The Shaw Group, a company which formerly used  as its ticker symbol
 Slade Green railway station in London, England (National Rail station code)
 Smart Green Resilient (planning concept) abbreviation
 Societa' di Gestione del Risparmio, an Italian abbreviation for investment management companies
 Soft gamma repeater, in astronomy
 Specific growth rate, a biology concept
 Standard gauge railway, commonly abbreviated SGR in East Africa
 Kenya Standard Gauge Railway
 Mombasa–Nairobi Standard Gauge Railway in Kenya
 Uganda Standard Gauge Railway
 Tanzania Standard Gauge Railway
 Stargate: Resistance, an online, third-person shooter based on the television series Stargate SG-1
 State of Good Repair, in mass transit
 Substantia gelatinosa of Rolando, a V-shaped or crescentic mass of translucent, gelatinous neuroglia in the spinal chord
 Sugar Land Regional Airport (SGR) in Texas, United States
 Sustainable growth rate, a finance concept
 Medicare Sustainable Growth Rate, a concept used by Medicare (United States)

See also
 Samsung SGR-A1, a South Korean military robot sentry